Carly Beth, (Chinese: 王韵藍）, is an American singer-songwriter from Grand Island, New York. She is known for her piano solos and viral success performing on multiple social media platforms.

Early life and career
Beth grew up on Grand Island, in upstate New York. She began taking piano lessons as a child and began writing piano solos at the age of nine. She continued classical training throughout high school.

At the age of 15, Beth wrote and produced an album of 12 piano solos called Taking Flight, which was released in 2014. Her album was recognized by Jim Brickman, a pianist and songwriter who invited Beth to perform on stage with him after hearing her album.

Although classically trained, after her first album, Beth started writing pop songs on both the piano and guitar. In 2016 Beth began studying at the University of Westminster in London. She graduated with a BA in Commercial Music Performance.

Social media success
At university in London, Beth met a Chinese friend who proposed that she perform music on a popular Chinese live streaming app, Yingke (映客). On the app, she sang her original music and covers in both English and Chinese. After nine months, Beth had a following of 45,000 fans on the platform. In 2017, she became one of the top musician broadcasters on the app, regularly having over 110,000 simultaneous viewers on her live-streamed performances.

After her success on Yingke, Beth began posting videos on Facebook, where a video of her playing and singing the Shape of You by Ed Sheeran reached 4.3 million views. After this she began live-streaming on Facebook.

In 2017, Beth began working with Jimmy Bralower, a multiple Grammy award winning musician. With his help with production, she released a single titled Sleepless Lullaby in February 2019.

References

External links 
 Official website

Living people
People from Grand Island, New York
American women singer-songwriters
21st-century American women singers
21st-century pianists
Singer-songwriters from New York (state)
Year of birth missing (living people)
21st-century women pianists